The Disaster of Yongjia refers to an event in Chinese history that occurred in 311 CE (5th year of the Yongjia era of the reign of Emperor Huai of Jin, hence the name), when forces of the Xiongnu-led Han Zhao dynasty captured and sacked Luoyang, the capital of the Western Jin dynasty. After this victory, Han Zhao's army committed a massacre of the city's inhabitants, killing the Jin crown prince, a host of ministers, and over 30,000 civilians. They also burnt down the palaces and dug up the Jin dynasty's mausoleums. This was a pivotal event during the Upheaval of the Five Barbarians and the early Sixteen Kingdoms era, and it played a major role in the fall of the Western Jin dynasty in 316 CE.

The Disaster of Yongjia was a major impetus for the mass migration and expansion of Han people into southern China. Many clan genealogies ascribe this event in particular as the reason why their ancestors moved from the north to places in Fujian, Guangdong, etc.

See also
Invasion and rebellion of the Five Barbarians

References

Jin dynasty (266–420)
Massacres in China
War crimes in China
Chinese war crimes
History of Luoyang